Stuart Trevor (born 29 November 1966) is a Scottish-born fashion designer who worked as head of menswear design at UK brand Reiss, founded and designed for retail group AllSaints and, most recently, launched his current label, Bolongaro Trevor, with partner Kait Bolongaro.

References

1966 births
Living people
British retail company founders
Scottish fashion designers
Place of birth missing (living people)